David Lee (1938 – October 16, 2008) was a Canadian sound engineer. He won an Oscar for Best Sound Mixing for the film Chicago. He worked on more than 60 films between 1973 and 2008.

Selected filmography
 Chicago (2002)

References

External links

1938 births
2008 deaths
Canadian audio engineers
Scottish emigrants to Canada
Best Sound Mixing Academy Award winners
Best Sound BAFTA Award winners
Best Sound Genie and Canadian Screen Award winners